Two is the fourth solo album by jazz keyboardist Bob James.

Reception

The album is the second of a series of jazz-funk classics (along with One, Three and BJ4).  Released in 1975,  the album charted at number two on the Jazz Album Charts.  The track "Take Me to the Mardi Gras" is one of the most widely used tracks in hip-hop breakbeat samples.

Track listing
 "Take Me to the Mardi Gras" (Paul Simon) – 5:50
 "I Feel a Song (In My Heart)" (Tony Camillo, Mary Sawyer) – 5:26
 "The Golden Apple" (Bob James) – 7:20
 "Farandole" (Georges Bizet) – 8:24
 "You're as Right as Rain" (Thom Bell, Linda Creed) – 5:28
 "Dream Journey" (Bob James) – 5:55

Personnel 
 Bob James – electric piano, clavinet, ARP Odyssey, Yamaha YC-30 combo organ, arrangements and conductor 
 Eric Gale – guitar (1, 2, 4), bass (1, 2, 4, 5, 6)
 Richard Resnicoff – guitar (3, 5)
 Gary King – bass (3)
 Andrew Smith – drums (1, 2, 4, 5, 6)
 Steve Gadd – drums (3)
 Arthur Jenkins – percussion
 Ralph MacDonald – percussion
 Patti Austin – vocals, lead vocal (2)
 Frank Floyd – vocals
 Lani Groves – vocals
 Zachary Sanders – vocals

Brass and Woodwinds
 Hubert Laws – flute (4), electric flute (4)
 Eddie Daniels – clarinet
 James Buffington – French horn
 Peter Gordon – French horn
 Al Richmond – French horn
 Wayne Andre – trombone
 Eddie Bert – trombone
 Tom Mitchell – trombone
 Tony Studd – trombone
 Randy Brecker – trumpet, flugelhorn
 John Frosk – trumpet, flugelhorn
 Victor Paz – trumpet, flugelhorn
 Lew Soloff – trumpet, flugelhorn
 Marvin Stamm – trumpet, flugelhorn

Strings
 Seymour Barab, Alla Goldberg, Warren Lash, Jesse Levy, George Ricci, Alan Shulman and Anthony Sophos – cello 
 Harry Cykman, Max Ellen, Paul Gershman, Harry Glickman, Emanuel Green, Harold Kohon, Charles Libove, Harry Lookofsky, Joe Malin, David Nadien, Gene Orloff and Matthew Raimondi – violin

Production 
 Creed Taylor – producer 
 Rudy Van Gelder – engineer
 Bob Ciano – album design 
 Greg Laurents – cover photography

Samples
 Many artists sampled the drums and bell part of the intro to the track "Take Me to the Mardi Gras", an instrumental cover of the Paul Simon song. It has since become a widely recognized drum break, similar to another break from another instrumental, "Ashley's Roachclip".
 The melody of "You're as Right as Rain" was sampled by Norwegian electronic music duo Röyksopp for their 2001 single "Eple" (whose title means "apple" in Norwegian, in reference to Twos album cover).

Charts

External links
 Bob James - Two at Discogs

References 

1975 albums
Bob James (musician) albums
CTI Records albums
Albums produced by Creed Taylor
Albums recorded at Van Gelder Studio